Blue is a 2002 Japanese romantic drama directed by Hiroshi Ando based on the manga of the same name by Kiriko Nananan.  The film stars Mikako Ichikawa as Kayako Kirishima and Manami Konishi as Masami Endo.  The film was first shown at the Toronto International Film Festival in 2002, and was released in Japanese theaters in 2003.

The film is about two teenage girls, Kayako Kirishima and Masami Endō, who find their friendship turning into something more.

Plot
Kayako Kirishima, in her third year at a high school, feels a sense of isolation in school life and vague admiration and uneasiness about the future. One day she makes friends with Endō, who is isolated from her surroundings because she remained in the same class for another year. Kayako is strongly attracted by Endō, who shows her a world that she didn't know.

Cast
 Mikako Ichikawa as Kayako Kirishima
 Manami Konishi as Masami Endō
 Asami Imajuku as Mieko Nakano
 Ayano Nakamura as Chika Watanabe
 Yōko Hirayama as Sumida Emiko
 Ayaka Ota as Ayana Murai
 Sosuke Takaoka as Mizuuchi Manabu
 Tasuku Amagishi as Atsushi Kirishibabbayaro

Awards
 24th Moscow International Film Festival : Best Actress Prize (Mikako Ichikawa)

Location
Niigata
Bandai Bridge
Furumachi
Niigata Station
Takaoka, Toyama

References

External links

Blue Support Page
Blue Cinema Topics

2002 films
Live-action films based on manga
Films set in Japan
2000s Japanese-language films
Lesbian-related films
Japanese LGBT-related films
2002 romantic drama films
LGBT-related romantic drama films
2002 LGBT-related films
Japanese romantic drama films
2000s Japanese films